Tuřany may refer to places in the Czech Republic:

Tuřany (Cheb District), a municipality and village in the Karlovy Vary Region
Tuřany (Kladno District), a municipality and village in the Central Bohemian Region
Brno-Tuřany, a borough of Brno
Brno–Tuřany Airport, an airport in Brno